The Kuyoh River is the river in Kuala Lumpur, Malaysia.

See also
 List of rivers of Malaysia

References

Rivers of Kuala Lumpur
Rivers of Malaysia